Vide e Cabeça is a civil parish in the municipality of Seia, Portugal. It was formed in 2013 by the merger of the former parishes Vide and Cabeça. The population in 2011 was 761, in an area of 56.47 km2.

References

Freguesias of Seia